"Leaving New York" is a song by American alternative rock band R.E.M. It was released as the lead single from the band's 13th studio album, Around the Sun (2004).  Although it was not as heavily promoted as earlier singles, it reached number five on the UK Singles Chart, becoming their 11th and final top-10 hit there. However, the song failed to chart on the Billboard Hot 100, becoming the only lead US single from an R.E.M. studio album not to chart on the US Hot 100 besides "Cant Get There from Here" from Fables of the Reconstruction in 1985.

In early live performances of the song (September 2004), the band would play Michael Stipe's "It's pulling me apart. Change." album backing vocal during the chorus and bridge of live performances. As early as February 2005, however, as evidenced on the R.E.M. Live disc, the band worked up an alternative whereby the backing vocals would be shared amongst Mike Mills, Scott McCaughey and Ken Stringfellow in order to make the song flow more smoothly.

Track listings
All tracks were written by Peter Buck, Mike Mills, and Michael Stipe unless otherwise stated.

UK CD1
 "Leaving New York" – 4:44
 "(Don't Go Back To) Rockville" (live, Oslo, Norway, October 25, 2003; Berry, Buck, Mills, Stipe) – 4:35

UK CD2
 "Leaving New York" – 4:49
 "You Are the Everything" (live, Raleigh, North Carolina – Soundcheck, October 10, 2003; Berry, Buck, Mills, Stipe) – 3:30
 "These Days" (live, Toronto, Ontario, September 30, 2003; Berry, Buck, Mills, Stipe) – 3:27

Charts

Weekly charts

Year-end charts

Release history

References

R.E.M. songs
2004 singles
2004 songs
New York City in fiction
Song recordings produced by Michael Stipe
Song recordings produced by Mike Mills
Song recordings produced by Pat McCarthy (record producer)
Song recordings produced by Peter Buck
Songs about New York City
Songs based on actual events
Songs written by Michael Stipe
Songs written by Mike Mills
Songs written by Peter Buck
Warner Records singles